Sidney Cohen, MD (7 Jun 1910, New York City – 8 May 1987, Santa Monica) was a psychiatrist, professor of medicine, and author, known as a leading expert on LSD, marijuana, cocaine, and other mood altering drugs.

Biography
Cohen graduated from Columbia University as a pharmacist in 1930. After study at the City College of New York, he then studied medicine in Germany, where he received in 1938 his medical degree from the University of Bonn. He did his medical internship at Queens General Hospital in New York City. After completing his internship he joined the U.S. Army Medical Corps, extensively participated in the WW II Pacific campaign, and was eventually promoted to colonel. (He served as a colonel in the U.S. Army Reserves until he retired from the Army in 1963.) After the end of WW II, he completed his residency at Wadsworth VA Hospital in Los Angeles. At Wadsworth VA Hospital, he became the chief of psychiatric service. There he was the Assistant Chief of Medical Service from 1948 to 1960. When UCLA's medical school was started in the late 1940s, many Wadsworth VA physicians served as faculty. At the UCLA School of Medicine, Cohen became in 1954 a faculty member and served as an associate clinical professor until 1970. From 1968 to 1970 he was on academic leave of absence when he was appointed by Richard Nixon in 1968 as the first director of the NIMH's Division of Narcotic Abuse and Drug Addiction. Cohen returned to the UCLA School of Medicine in 1970 when he was promoted to clinical professor. He was the author or co-author of a number of books and over 300 articles.

In the 1950s he was a pioneer in research on LSD. He did research on barbiturates, amphetamines, and tranquilizers, as well as hallucinogens.

Upon his death he was survived by his widow, Ilse, a daughter, Dorothy, and a son, Richard.

Selected publications

as author

with Richard Alpert: 

 
with Donald P. Tashkin: 

with Therese Andrysiak: 

with Robert O'Brien:

as editor

References

American psychiatrists
Psychedelic drug researchers
Columbia University College of Pharmacy alumni
University of Bonn alumni
David Geffen School of Medicine at UCLA faculty
1910 births
1987 deaths